Michele Watley, better known by her stage name Midori (born July 19, 1968), is an American singer, dancer, model, actress and former pornographic actress. She was inducted into the AVN Hall of Fame in 2009. She was the first African-American woman to win an AVN award, when she was named "Best Supporting Actress" in 2001. Watley was also named one of the top 10 "hottest black porn stars" of all time by Complex and The Independent named her "the queen of the black hardcore market".

Early life and career

Michele Watley was born in Durham, North Carolina. Watley has a sister, Jody Watley, and a brother. When Watley was a toddler, her family relocated to Kansas City, Missouri, followed by Chicago, Illinois. Her grandfather and father were ministers. Her parents divorced when she was twelve, and Watley and her sister Jody moved to California. Watley called her childhood "sheltered" and that her parents were "strict". When she was in junior high school, she said she was "mortified" seeing girls kissing their boyfriends. Eventually, Watley turned into what she called "a wild child".

As a teenager, Watley started dancing, performing hip hop, ballet and jazz styles. She studied theater in college and performed in plays. As a young adult, she lived in England for nine months and in 1986, she attended dance school in France. Watley was also a hair model for Vidal Sassoon, as well as a backup singer and dancer. As Michele Watley, she acted in commercials and modeled in Elle. She did not pursue modeling full-time, as she was "not tall enough to be a super model".

Career
She appeared as Michele Watley in John Landis' comedy film starring Eddie Murphy, Coming to America (1989), as one of the nude bathroom maidens.

After her role in Coming to America, she changed her stage name to Midori. She worked as an exotic dancer for four years and in 1995 she started performing in hardcore pornography. Her first scene was with Jake Steed. After that scene, she did not perform in films another year. Watley's rationale for entering the adult film industry was to increase the representation of women of color in the industry, which has historically been white.

In the 1990s, Watley began directing pornographic films and started backup singing, including for Kid Rock in 1999. She initially tried to avoid appearing in stereotypical Black themed films, and early in her career was mostly featured in interracial scenes in white-produced films. Watley eventually started working with Black male performers because  she "didn't want to have Black guys thinking I didn't do them too". She became a spokesperson for the Free Speech Coalition. She was co-featured, as Michele, in the 1997 stripper documentary The Unveiling, alongside Dixie Evans and Eldad Sahar. Variety described Watley as "a petite African-American single mom who does an athletic pole-climbing act". The Los Angeles Times described Watley as being "loaded with personality, and you hope that she fulfills her dream of moving into mainstream entertainment as a singer or actress".

In 1997, she recorded a duet with Oran "Juice" Jones at Tommy Boy Records and performed on tour with Puff Daddy and Lil' Kim. The next year, Spike Lee offered Watley a role in He Got Game - as a prostitute - a role she declined because she did not want to play a sex worker. Watley was featured in the British documentary Glamour Girlz on Channel 4, which documents Black women in the adult film industry. Watley was featured in the show alongside Charmaine Sinclair, who had relocated to Los Angeles from London to further her career, and porn legend Ron Jeremy. In the series, Watley helps Sinclair expand her career into the adult film industry. Watley also discusses her desire to move into music, and is seen meeting by phone with Luther Campbell of 2 Live Crew to discuss prospects.

In 1999, she had one track entitled 5-10-15-20, which she wrote on the Porn to Rock compilation, which was released on Tommy Boy Records. The single features Oran "Juice" Jones. In an interview with the National Post, Watley said that she was pursuing a career in hip hop by using her fame as a porn star. Then National Post music critic Finbarr O'Reilly called Watley's single on the compilation "one of the better tracks". To support the compilation, Watley toured with fellow porn performers Madison Stone, Johnny Toxic, and Nina Whett, including performing at South by Southwest. That same year, Kid Rock produced the track F.M.A. for the Deep Porn compilation with Midori on vocals. The New York Daily News described the single as "moaning unprintable pillow talk over a backdrop of distorted guitars and hip-hop drums". She also appeared on the cover of Eminem and Royce da 5'9"'s side project Bad Meets Evil's single "Nuttin' to Do". Watley has a second track, "Zap", produced by Wide (a duo consisting of Liquid Todd and Dr. Luke). Watley credits Madonna and Lil' Kim as opening the door for sex positive performers, and sex workers, to perform music in mainstream entertainment.

Watley appeared on the cover of Andrew Dice Clay's album Face Down, Ass Up in 2000. She also released her first album, the dance LP Midori (AKA) Michele Watley. In 2001, she won the "Best Supporting Actress" video award at the AVN Awards, making her the first African-American woman to ever win an AVN award. That same year, she released the rap album Miss Judged, which featured rapper AMG. In 2001, she appeared in the video for Coo Coo Cal's "My Projects." She toured internationally for her music, including New Zealand and Europe. She starred in the Polish porn Big Sister and toured Poland. Watley appeared as singer and MC on rapper Warrior's single "Who's Hustlin' Who" in 2003. Watley was described as "decent but uninteresting" on the single by Rap Reviews. Around this time, she also began exploring a comeback. During her exploration of potential roles, Watley expressed issues with being offered primarily roles for older women in porn, including as MILFs.

Personal life
In a 1997 interview with Black Video Illustrated, Watley said she was straight; however, in the 1998, documentary The Unveiling, Watley identified as bisexual. She is monogamous. In 1999, Watley was in a relationship with Kid Rock. The relationship ended after three months, with both Rock and Watley citing Rock's busy schedule as the reason for the break up. Watley discovered she was pregnant after her relationship with Rock ended, and she decided not to have the baby.

Watley is divorced from a man she describes as a "knucklehead". She has a daughter.

Watley does not like watching pornography. It took considerable time for her family to accept that she was an adult film entertainer. She took her mother with her to an adult film award ceremony in an attempt to convince her mother that the adult film industry "also holds formal events where people dress up in black ties and fancy dresses".

Awards and nominations

Discography
Albums:
 2001: Miss Judged, (7 tracks)
 2000: Midori (AKA) Michele Watley (5 tracks)

Singles:
 2003: "Who's Hustlin' Who" - Warrior featuring Midori

Album appearances:
 2002: Perfect Weapon, Warrior, "Who's Hustlin' Who" feat. Midori
 2000: Deep Porn, Various Artists, "F.M.A." - Kid Rock featuring Midori, "Zap" - Wide featuring Midori
 1999: Porn to Rock, Various Artists, "5,10,15,20" - Midori featuring Oran "Juice" Jones
 1997: Player's Call, Oran "Juice" Jones, "Let's Stay Together" (featuring Midori)
Cover girl:
 2000: Face Down, Ass Up - Andrew Dice Clay
 1999: "Nuttin' To Do," Bad Meets Evil (Royce/Eminem)

Music video appearances: 
 2001: "My Projects," Coo Coo Cal (guest appearance)

Further reading
Miller-Young, Mireille. "A Taste for Brown Sugar: Black Women in Pornography." Durham: Duke University Press.

References

External links
 
 
 
 
 
 Midori's profile at AVN


1968 births
Living people
20th-century American actresses
21st-century American actresses
21st-century American rappers
21st-century American women singers
Actresses from Durham, North Carolina
African-American women rappers
African-American pornographic film actors
American pornographic film actresses
AVN Award winners
Bisexual pornographic film actresses
LGBT African Americans
Pornographic film actors from North Carolina
21st-century American singers
20th-century African-American women
20th-century African-American people
21st-century African-American women singers
21st-century women rappers